The Wisconsin Department of Transportation (WisDOT) is a governmental agency of the U.S. state of Wisconsin responsible for planning, building and maintaining the state's highways.  It is also responsible for planning transportation in the state relating to rail, including passenger rail, public transit, freight water transport and air transport, including partial funding of the Milwaukee-to-Chicago Hiawatha Service provided by Amtrak.

The Wisconsin DOT is made up of three executive offices and five divisions organized according to transportation function. WisDOT's main office is located at Hill Farms State Transportation Building in Madison, and it maintains regional offices throughout the state.

History
In 1905 the state legislature introduced an amendment to the state constitution that would allow the state to fund construction and improvement of roads. It was approved by voters in 1908. On June 14, 1911 governor Francis McGovern signed legislation that created the State Highway Commission. Its members met for the first time three days later. The commission originally consisted of five part-time members and nine permanent employees. Its duties included reviewing proposed highway projects and regulating the construction and inspection of highways and bridges. In 1912, the commission started the Wisconsin Road School. This brought together numerous road professionals to develop construction and maintenance best practices. A highway fund was created in 1925 by charging a tax on fuel of two cents per gallon. The commission received $15.2 million over the next fiscal year. The commission was reorganized in 1929, changing it to three full-time members. Over the 1930s and 40s, the responsibilities of the commission continued to expand. By 1940 it had 500 employees. In 1967 the Highway Commission was merged with the Wisconsin Aeronautics Commission, Department of Motor Vehicles, and the Wisconsin State Patrol to form the Wisconsin Department of Transportation.

Structure
The department is led by the executive offices. This level is composed of the Office of Public Affairs, the Office of General Counsel and the Office of Policy, Finance, and Improvement as well as the positions of secretary deputy secretary, and assistant deputy secretary. Below this are five divisions.

Division of Business management
The DBM does the general business work for the department. It contains the department's human resources services and information technology support. Its tasks include:
Fiscal managing of the department's projects
Managing of facilities and equipment
Centralized purchasing
Risk mitigation and employee safety services
Maintaining records and forms
Supporting communication

Division of Motor Vehicles
The DMV provides services to drivers. It has 90 locations throughout the state. Its tasks include:
Educating and testing drivers
Issuing driver's licenses
Issuing license plates
Registering vehicle titles
Maintaining records of vehicle related transactions
Providing vehicle emission testing

Division of Transportation Investment Management
The DTIM serves a wide variety of functions. It contains the Aeronautics Bureau. It also works with planning projects and assisting in mass transit. Its tasks include:
Educating pilots
Regulating tall structures
Providing technical assistance to airports
Collecting and analyzing data
Developing multi-year highway plans
Assisting local government in construction and maintenance of roads

Division of Transportation System Development
The DTSD is responsible for constructing, maintaining, and operating the state's highways. It is divided into statewide bureaus and five regional offices that serve different parts of the state. Its task include:
Planning and constructing projects
Protecting public interests
Monitoring quality and efficiency of programs
Collaborating with local governments

Division of State Patrol
The DSP administers the Wisconsin State Patrol. Its tasks include:
Enforcing laws
Assisting drivers
Inspecting vehicles such as trucks, buses, and ambulances
Operating weighing facilities
Training law enforcement officers
Assisting local law enforcement agencies
Educating the public

Funding
The department uses the state's Transportation Fund, which is separate from the General Fund. Money in this fund can only be used for transportation purposes. A majority of revenue, about 56%, is provided by the state. This is raised mainly through the gas tax and vehicle registration fees. Another 24% comes federal funding. The remaining revenue comes from bonds and other funds. In the state's 2015-2017 budget, the Department received a total of $6.82 billion. This consisted of $3,852.6 million from the gas tax and fees, $1,655 million from federal funds, $910.7 million from bonds, $229.9 million of general purpose revenue, and $227.9 million from other funds.

Initiatives
The department runs a Transportation Reading Challenge to use transportation as a theme to encourage kids to read. The challenge allows kids ten and under to participate by reading stories that contain various types of transportation. They must record the books on a reading challenge ticket which is then sent to the Office of Public Affairs to win prizes.

See also
 Vehicle registration plates of Wisconsin

References

External links
Official website
 Community Maps - Wisconsin County TSC Crash Mapping

Department of Transportation
State departments of transportation of the United States
Motor vehicle registration agencies
Transportation
Government agencies established in 1967